Thinglink (Thinglink Oy in Finland and Thinglink Inc. in the US) is a Finnish education and media technology company founded by Ulla-Maaria Koivula (Engeström).

Thinglink started from the idea of connecting objects in our physical environment to digital information about them and making it easy for anyone to do that. Over the years the concept expanded to using digital objects, and virtual tours, to access places and situations in the physical world.

In 2018 Thinglink was awarded the UNESCO ICT in Education Prize.

References

External links

 Gigaom
 TechCrunch Europe
 The Next Web
 The New York Times
The Journal
EdTechReview India
What is Interactive InfoGraphics

Index (publishing)
Identifiers